Young and Free is the third studio album by the English all-female heavy metal band Rock Goddess. It was recorded in 1985 and was released in 1987 by the small French label JID exclusively in France, after the expiration of their recording contract with A&M. In 1994, Magnum Music Group tracked down the master tapes and re-released the album on Thunderbolt (with the additional title "The Lost Album"); The album also received a new album cover. In 2006 it was reissued once again with new artwork and the new title The Original Rock Goddesses. It was their last album for over 32 years until their latest and final album, 2019's This Time.

Track listing

Personnel
Rock Goddess
Jody Turner – lead vocals, guitar
Julie Turner – drums, backing vocals, lead vocals on track 7
Dee O'Malley – bass guitar, keyboards, backing vocals

Session musicians
Paul Samson – guitar overdubs
Jo Julian – keyboard programming

Production team
Paul Samson – producer
Jo Julian – producer, engineer
Gerrard Johnson – engineer
Ian Cooper – mastering

References

External links

Rock Goddess at Metal Maidens.com

1987 albums
Rock Goddess albums